The 2007 San Marino and Rimini Riviera motorcycle Grand Prix was the thirteenth round of the 2007 MotoGP Championship.  It took place on the weekend of 31 August–2 September 2007 at the Misano World Circuit in Misano Adriatico.

As of 2020, this was the last race where no European rider finished the race on the podium; two Oceanian riders and an American rider filled the three podium places for this race.

MotoGP classification

250 cc classification

125 cc classification

Championship standings after the race (MotoGP)

Below are the standings for the top five riders and constructors after round thirteen has concluded. 

Riders' Championship standings

Constructors' Championship standings

 Note: Only the top five positions are included for both sets of standings.

References

San Marino and Rimini Riviera motorcycle Grand Prix
San Marino
San Marino and Rimini